Release is David Knopfler's first solo album after leaving Dire Straits. It was released in 1983 on the Peach River and Passport labels, and in 1997 on the Paris label.

Track listing 
All tracks composed by David Knopfler; except where indicated
"Soul Kissing" 		 
"Come to Me" (David Knopfler, Harry Bogdanovs)	 
"Madonna's Daughter" 		 
"The Girl and the Paperboy" 		 
"Roman Times" (David Knopfler, Harry Bogdanovs)
"Sideshow" 		 
"Little Brother" 		 
"Hey Henry"
"Night Train" (David Knopfler, Harry Bogdanovs)		 
"The Great Divide"

Personnel 
David Knopfler – guitar, vocals, piano, synthesizer
Bub Roberts – guitar
Mark Knopfler  – rhythm guitar (3)
Betsy Cook – piano, synthesizer, backing vocals
Danny Schogger – piano (10)
Harry Bogdanovs – synthesizer
Kevin Powell – bass (except 1 & 8)
John Illsley – bass (1)
Pino Palladino – bass (8)
Arran Ahmun – drums, percussion
DMX - drums
Germaine Johnson, Marie Broady – backing vocals 
Mike Pace – saxophone
Roger Downham – vibraphone
Bobby Valentino – violin (8)

References 

1983 debut albums
David Knopfler albums